The Credit Institutions Directive 2013/36/EU is an EU law that aims to ensure banks are run prudently, and do not go insolvent. It was introduced as part of a package rules, following the financial crisis of 2007–2008, with the Capital Requirements Regulation 2013.

Contents

Titles I-II, administration
Title I concerns definitions. Title II explains competent authorities to administer the Directive, decentralised within member states (e.g. the Financial Conduct Authority in the UK, the Bundesamt für Finanz in Germany).

Title III, authorisation
Title III sets out requirements to be active as a credit institution" (especially, running a bank). Article 8 contains the key requirement for credit institutions to be authorised. Article 9, prohibition on taking deposits without authority.
art 11, ‘Member States shall not require the application for authorisation to be examined in terms of the economic needs of the market.’ 
art 12, initial €12m capital.
art 14, authority depends on disclosing identities of shareholders or members with qualifying holdings, or of the largest 20 holders. 
art 18, exhaustive reasons for withdrawal of authorisation – esp (c) it no longer fulfils conditions under which it was granted authority. 
ch 2, The right of establishment of credit institutions

Titles IV-VI, establishment
Title IV concerns minimum initial capital. 

Title V concerns the rights of establishment and freedom to provide services. Article 35, restates the right to establish a branch in another member state, a CI must notify authorities of home member state. Article 40 concerns reporting requirements that host member states can require. Article 43 adds that host states can take emergency precautionary measures in derogation from the general rights.

Title VI concerns relations with third countries.

Title VII, prudential and governance standards
Title VII concerns prudential supervision of credit institutions and corporate governance. Article 49 says that the basic position is that the home state of the credit institution is responsible for supervision. Article 50 requires collaboration on supervision among member state authorities. Article 73 contains provisions on internal capital. Article 74 says internal governance and recovery plans should be defined and transparent. Article 76 requires standards for the organisation and treatment of risks. 

Articles 88 to 96 contain loose provisions on corporate governance. Under Article 88(1) there must be a segregation of management and supervision duties to prevent conflicts of interest, and (2) non-executive directors must be on the nomination committee for new appointees. Article 89 requires country by country reporting to disclose on (a) activities’ name and place (b) the credit institution's turnover (c) employees who are full time (d) profits and loss before tax (e) after tax (f) public subsidies received. Article 91 says management body members must have skills to do duties, ‘reflect an adequately broad range of experiences’ (2) spend enough time to do work (3) no more than one exec directorship and two non-exec directorships or four non-exec directorships (4) definitions (5) not counting non-commercial jobs (6) competent authorities can authorise an additional one (7) management must understand main risks (8) independence (9) training (10) the nomination-committee should ‘put in place a policy promoting diversity on the management board’ (11) with reference to article 435(2) of the Capital Requirements Regulation 575/2013 to benchmark diversity, and finally (12) the European Banking Authority will establish guidelines on time, knowledge, integrity, diversity, etc. Article 92 states remuneration policies should be enforced by competent authorities. Article 93 states institutions receiving government support should (a) strictly limit variable pay to ‘percentage of net revenue’ (b) set by competent authority, (c) and have no variable given pay to management ‘unless justified’. Article 95 says there must be a remuneration committee for all credit institutions, with non-executive directors. ‘If employee representation... is provided for by national law, the remuneration committee shall include one or more employee representatives.’ Lastly, article 96 requires a credit institution to maintain a website on governance and pay for the rules under articles 88–96. 

Section III of Title VII concerns the supervisory review and evaluation process. Article 100 contains rules on the "annual stress test".

Titles VIII-XI, final provisions
Title VIII requires disclosure by competent authorities. Title IX concerns implementing acts. Title X concerns amendments. Title XI contains transitional and final provisions.

See also
EU law
Banking law

Notes

References

European Union directives